Konnor Chase Pilkington (born September 12, 1997) is an American professional baseball pitcher for the Cleveland Guardians of Major League Baseball (MLB).

Amateur career
Pilkington attended East Central High School in Moss Point, Mississippi. For his high school career, he had a 25–7 win–loss record with a 1.70 earned run average (ERA), totaled 307 strikeouts, and helped opponents to a batting average of .144. In June 2014, at the age of 16, he committed to Mississippi State University to play college baseball.

As a freshman at Mississippi State in 2016, Pilkington went 3–1 with a 2.08 ERA with 42 strikeouts while appearing in 14 games (11 starts). After the season, he pitched in the Cape Cod Baseball League for the Brewster Whitecaps with whom he posted a 2–1 record in  innings while finishing the league third overall with a 1.37 ERA and earning a spot on the CCBL 2016 Year-End All-League Team. In 2017, as a sophomore, Pilkington started a team high 17 games, going 8–5 with a 3.08 ERA and 111 strikeouts in 108 innings. He was invited to play for the USA Baseball Collegiate National Team during the summer where he pitched against Cuba, Japan and the Chinese Taipei teams while collecting a 2.65 ERA in five appearances.
 As a junior in 2018, Pilkington was named a Preseason All-American Second Team by Baseball America, Collegiate Baseball, NCBWA, and Perfect Game and a Third Team Preseason All-American  by D1 Baseball.
Pilkington was the Friday night starter for MSU. He finished the 2018 season with a 3–6 record and a 4.47 ERA in 18 starts.

Professional career

Chicago White Sox
Pilkington was selected by the Chicago White Sox in the third round of the 2018 Major League Baseball draft and he signed for $650,000. He made his professional debut with the Rookie-level Arizona League White Sox and was later promoted to the Great Falls Voyagers of the Rookie Advanced Pioneer League. Over 14 innings between the two clubs, he was 0–1 with a 7.07 ERA. Pilkington began 2019 with the Kannapolis Intimidators of the Class A South Atlantic League in their starting rotation. After going 1–0 with a 1.62 ERA in six starts, Pilkington was promoted to the Winston-Salem Dash of the Class A-Advanced Carolina League with whom he finished the year. Over 19 starts with the Dash, he went 4–9 with a 4.99 ERA, striking out 96 over  innings. To begin the 2021 season, he was assigned to the Birmingham Barons of the Double-A South.  Over 14 starts with the Barons, he went 4–4 with a 3.48 ERA and a 0.92 WHIP while striking out 71 over 62 innings.

Cleveland Indians / Guardians
On July 29, 2021, the White Sox traded Pilkington to the Cleveland Indians in exchange for César Hernández. Upon acquiring him, the Indians assigned Pilkington to the Akron RubberDucks of the Double-A Northeast. Over eight games (seven starts) with Akron, he went 3-2 with a 2.33 ERA and 49 strikeouts over  innings.

The newly-named Cleveland Guardians selected Pilkington to their 40-man roster on November 19, 2021. On April 2, 2022, the Guardians announced that he had been named to the Opening Day roster. On April 14, Pilkington was optioned to Triple-A without making an appearance for the big league club. He briefly became a phantom ballplayer until he was recalled to the major league roster the following day.

References

External links

Mississippi State Bulldogs bio

1997 births
Living people
People from Pascagoula, Mississippi
Baseball players from Mississippi
Major League Baseball pitchers
Cleveland Guardians players
Mississippi State Bulldogs baseball players
Brewster Whitecaps players
Arizona League White Sox players
Great Falls Voyagers players
Kannapolis Intimidators players
Winston-Salem Dash players
Birmingham Barons players
Akron RubberDucks players